Anerosoma is a monotypic snout moth genus described by Rolf-Ulrich Roesler in 1971. Its only species, Anerosoma apicipunctella, described by Aristide Caradja in 1925, is found in China.

References

Phycitinae
Monotypic moth genera
Moths of Asia